Lieutenant-General Dudley Sheridan Skelton,  (8 August 1878 - 2 March 1962) was a British Army officer, author and physician.

Skelton was educated at Bloxham School. He commissioned into the British Army as a lieutenant on probation in the Royal Army Medical Corps on 1 September 1902. Skelton served in the First World War in the Royal Artillery, and was awarded the Distinguished Service Order and the Military Cross. He was promoted to Brevet Lieutenant Colonel in August 1917, and transferred to the Royal Army Medical Corps. He was promoted to colonel in 1930. In 1935 he became Honorary Surgeon to George V. He was invested as a Companion of the Order of the Bath in the 1936 Birthday Honours, while serving as Deputy Director of Medical Services, Southern Command, India. He retired as a Lieutenant-General on 13 October 1937.

Skelton was a descendant of the playwright Richard Brinsley Sheridan. His niece was the writer Barbara Skelton.

Publications
By Motor Through Ceylon (1903)
This Amazing India (1904)

References

1878 births
1962 deaths
British Army generals
British Army personnel of World War I
British travel writers
Companions of the Distinguished Service Order
Companions of the Order of the Bath
Fellows of the Royal College of Surgeons
People educated at Bloxham School
Recipients of the Military Cross
Royal Army Medical Corps officers
Royal Artillery officers